Sir Edward Watson ( – 1 March 1617) of Rockingham, Northamptonshire was an English landowner and politician. He was Sheriff of Northamptonshire from 1591 to 1592, was elected MP for Stamford in 1601 and was knighted in 1603.

Born about 1549, he was the eldest son of Edward Watson (d. 1584) of Rockingham and Dorothy, eldest daughter of Sir Edward Montagu (–1557) of Boughton and his first wife, Cicely Lane.

He married, in April 1567, Anne (d. 1612), daughter of Kenelm Digby (d. 1590) of Stoke Dry, Rutland, with whom he had two sons and eight daughters:
Lewis Watson, 1st Baron Rockingham (1584 – 1653) 
Edward Watson (bap. 25 January 1586)
Anne Watson (bap. 22 September 1569) married Sir Charles Norwich of Brampton Ash, Northamptonshire.
Emma Watson married John Graunte of North Bucks, Warwickshire.
Mary Watson married Sir Anthony Maney of Lutton, Kent.
Catherine Watson married Sir Thomas Palmer of East Carlton, Northamptonshire.
Elizabeth Watson married, firstly, Sir John Nedham (d. 1618); secondly, Sir Edward Tyrrell of Thornton, Buckinghamshire.
Temperance Watson married Thomas Dolman.
Frances Watson married Rowland Vaughan of London.
Dorothy Watson married Sir George Throgmorton of Fulbrook.

Watson was knighted by James I at the Charterhouse on 11 May 1603 and the king was his guest for three days in 1605. In 1613 Watson made over his estates to his eldest son, Sir Lewis. He died 1 March 1617 and was buried 4 March at Rockingham.

References

Sources

External links
Rockingham Castle

1549 births
1617 deaths

Year of birth uncertain
English MPs 1601
High Sheriffs of Northamptonshire